Euchaetes elegans, the elegant pygarctia, is a moth of the family Erebidae. It was described by Richard Harper Stretch in 1874. It is found in the US states of California, Arizona, New Mexico, Nevada and Texas, and in Mexico, Guatemala, Panama and Colombia.

Adults are on wing from July to September.

The larvae feed on Asclepias species.

References

 Arctiidae genus list at Butterflies and Moths of the World of the Natural History Museum

Phaegopterina
Moths described in 1874